Håkon Martinus Nissen-Lie (born 26 March 1964) is a Norwegian former windsurfer. He competed in the men's Division II event at the 1988 Summer Olympics.

References

External links
 
 

1964 births
Living people
Norwegian windsurfers
Norwegian male sailors (sport)
Olympic sailors of Norway
Sailors at the 1988 Summer Olympics – Division II
People from Asker
Sportspeople from Viken (county)